WLNC (1300 AM) is a radio station broadcasting adult contemporary, oldies, and Carolina Beach Music. Licensed to Laurinburg, North Carolina, United States, the station is currently owned by Scotland Broadcasting Company, Inc.

The station's daytime power is 500 watts (non-directional). While the station is authorized to broadcast at night with a power of 74 watts (non-directional), it currently does not operate at night.

External links
Official website

LNC